KFTV.com (formally Kemps) is an online resource where users can search from over 18,000 film, television and commercial production services companies in 171 countries worldwide. Users can browse for services within many categories, including; Production companies, SFX, Props & Wardrobe, Post Production, Stages & Studio, Equipment Rental, Crew & Support Services, Equipment Manufacture & Sale, Crew, Location Services, Broadcasting Facilities.

Also included are country guides and regular news articles.

KFTV.com is owned by Media Business Insight (MBI). Kemps was first published as a directory, Kemps Film, Television and Commercial Production Services Handbook, in 1956. The original Kemps website was launched in 1998. The name was changed from Kemps to KFTV.com (which is an abbreviation of Kemps, Film, TV and Video) in December 2012, following a redesign and update of the website.

The new version of KFTV maintains the Kemps content but with new enhancements and features to give the website a modern look and feel. The website is used by producers, directors, line producers, production managers and location managers to find local services when filming overseas.

References

External links
Kemps website

Data publishing